Kathryn Keller (born in El Dorado, Arkansas, 1952) is an American visual artist who is best known for her oil paintings and landscapes.

Early life and education
Keller received her Bachelor of Arts degree in Fine Arts and English from Sewanee: The University of the South, Tennessee in 1974. She then took a Painting and Drawing Class at the Arkansas Arts Center in Little Rock, Arkansas in 1977. She enrolled in the Art Students League of New York in New York and took a painting and drawing class there from 1979 to 1980, and then at the New Orleans Academy of Fine Arts, New Orleans, Louisiana from 2005 to 2013.

Career
Keller grew up in the Southern United States. Over the past twenty-five years, she has been artist focusing on landscapes, people, and homes, created from life.

Keller's work is featured in galleries all over the country. Currently, her art is represented by LeMieux Galleries in New Orleans and throughout the state of Louisiana. In Atlanta, Georgia, her work is being represented by Spalding Nix Fine Art Gallery. 

Keller has exhibited her work numerous times in other states as well, including Texas, Kentucky, Mississippi, New Mexico, and New York. In addition, her work is in the permanent collection of over 11 different museums including the Alexandria Museum of Art in Louisiana, the Georgia Museum of Art in Georgia, the Greenville Museum of Art in Greenville, North Carolina, and the Wichita Falls Museum of Art in Wichita Falls, Texas.

Themes
One of the major themes in Keller's art is solitude. Vast emptiness, silent interior, vast green landscapes, and open fields are typical of her artwork.

Keller's early work could be classified as narrative in nature, focusing on myth, family life, birth, and death. In her late forties, she began working almost exclusively from life, drawing inspiration from her surroundings, family, and location. Over the past twenty-five years, she has focused almost exclusively on landscapes, cityscapes, and interior painting from life, working solely in oil and watercolors.

Most recently in 2022, Kathryn has decided to spend a part of her time creating work from national parks throughout the State of Louisiana.

Personal life
Keller raised her children and spent a lot of time in New Orleans in the Garden District of New Orleans. After Hurricane Katrina, she settled back full-time in Alexandria, Louisiana. She paints from Inglewood Farm in Alexandria, Louisiana, at the geographic center of the State and of the South. Her familiarity with and love for South can be seen in her artwork.

References

External links
Official website – Katherine Keller

Living people
1952 births
Artists from Arkansas
Painters from Arkansas